"With You" is a song written by Robin Lee Bruce and Matt Hendrix, and recorded by American country music artist Lila McCann.  It was released in January 1999 as the first single from her album Something in the Air.  The song reached No. 9 on the Billboard Hot Country Singles & Tracks chart in June 1999, becoming her last Top 40 single to date. It was also McCann's only entry on the Billboard Hot 100, peaking at number 41.

Chart performance

Year-end charts

References

1999 singles
Lila McCann songs
Asylum Records singles
Music videos directed by Steven Goldmann
Songs written by Robin Lee Bruce
1999 songs